

Top Division

Group A

Head coach:  Pat Quinn

Head coach:  Marek Sýkora

Head coach:  Ernst Höfner

Head coach:  Oleg Bolyakin

Head coach:  Ron Rolston

Group B

Head coach:  Jukka Rautakorpi

Head coach:  Andrejs Maticins

Head coach:  Sergei Nemchinov

Head coach:  Stefan Mikes

Head coach:  Pär Mårts

NHL prospects by team
There were 72 NHL-drafted prospects playing in the tournament. In addition, six of the top-ten ranked players in the 2009 draft participated. The Latvian and Kazakh teams did not have any NHL prospects on their rosters.

References

See also
 2009 World Junior Ice Hockey Championships
 2009 World Junior Ice Hockey Championships - Division I
 2009 World Junior Ice Hockey Championships - Division II

Rosters
World Junior Ice Hockey Championships rosters